A Cry in the Wild is a 1990 American coming-of-age survival drama film based on the book Hatchet, written by Gary Paulsen. The film stars Jared Rushton as Brian, Pamela Sue Martin as Brian's mom, Stephen Meadows as Brian's dad, and Ned Beatty as the pilot. It spawned three sequels: White Wolves: A Cry in the Wild II; White Wolves II: Legend of the Wild; and White Wolves III: Cry of the White Wolf.

Plot
Brian Robeson and his mother receive a package. She later gives it to Brian revealing it to be a hatchet at the airport. When Brian gets on the single engine plane with the pilot they have a short conversation.

The pilot lets Brian fly the plane and Brian enjoys it. However, when the pilot has a heart attack and dies, the plane crashes in the wilderness of the Yukon, leaving Brian to try to survive, all while dealing with his parents' divorce.

Cast
 Jared Rushton as Brian Robeson
 Pamela Sue Martin as Brian's mother
 Stephen Meadows as Brian's father
 Ned Beatty as Plane pilot

Release
The film was 23, 1991, it aired for the first time on television in the United States on PBS as part of the series WonderWorks.

Reception

The film received mixed reviews from critics.

References

External links
 A Cry in the Wild at Internet Movie Database
 

1990 films
1990s coming-of-age drama films
1990 independent films
American coming-of-age drama films
American independent films
American survival films
Films about animals
Films about bears
Films about children
Films about families
Films based on American novels
Films produced by Julie Corman
Films produced by Roger Corman
Films about aviation accidents or incidents
Films about wolves
1990 drama films
Films directed by Mark Griffiths (director)
1990s English-language films
1990s American films